is a Japanese water polo player. She was selected to the Japan women's national water polo team, for the 2020 Summer Olympics.

She participated at the  2015 All Japan Water Polo Championship, 2019 FINA Junior Water Polo World Championships, and 2019 FINA Women's Water Polo World League.

References

External links 
 Kako Kawaguchi (CNC), OCTOBER 10, 2015 - Water Polo

1999 births
Living people
Japanese female water polo players
Olympic water polo players of Japan
Water polo players at the 2020 Summer Olympics
21st-century Japanese women